"Plastic keys to paradise" were golden-colored, plastic keys that were allegedly distributed to young Iranian military volunteers during the Iran–Iraq War (1980–88). Some claim that the keys were widely issued and promised passage into paradise for soldiers who were killed. While some western journalists reported having seen soldiers wearing such keys, other people dismiss stories of these keys as propaganda.

Soldiers were issued metallic identification bags, and/or colorful identification cards, along with a copy of Shaikh Abbass Qumi (d. 1959) prayer book entitled Mafatih al-Janan or Keys to Paradise. Iranian soldiers' possession of military and religious items enabled some opponents of Khomeini to argue that the soldiers had been issued 'Plastic Keys to Heaven' – a concept that they hoped would evoke derision in the Western media against Khomeini.

Professor Seyed Marandi considered the "absurdity" of the plastic keys (for which he would like to see an evidence of, as a veteran of the Iran–Iraq war) and similar allegations, a feature of orientalist discourse which is not challenged by its Western audience, "as they reinforce the dominant representations of Iran in America by constructing an exotic Iran principally derived from US archives".

In 2000, New York Times journalist Elaine Sciolino wrote that, during the war, she had witnessed "Iranian soldiers ready for battle wearing small gold keys on their uniforms where other soldiers might wear medals. They were the keys that would immediately take their souls to heaven if they should die."

In her 2007 illustrated memoir Persepolis, Marjane Satrapi wrote that she heard of these keys while living in Iran during the war. She relates how she and her mother were shocked to learn from one of their neighbors in Tehran that gold painted plastic keys to paradise had been distributed to the boys in her son's school. The boys were reportedly told that the key would grant them admission to heaven if they died in battle, which caused the neighbor to tell Satrapi and her mother, "All my life, I've been faithful to this religion. If it's come to this... well I can't believe in anything anymore..."

References

Anti-Iranian sentiments
Iran–Iraq War
Propaganda in Iran